Banapuriswarar Temple is a Hindu temple located in the town of Kumbakonam in Tamil Nadu, India. It is dedicated to the Hindu god Shiva. According to Hindu mythology, the site was the place from where Shiva took his aim at a pot of amrita with his bow and arrow.

Specialty 
12 Shiva temples are connected with Mahamaham festival which happens once in 12 years in Kumbakonam. They are :
Kasi Viswanathar Temple, 
Kumbeswarar Temple, 
Someswarar Temple, 
Nageswara Temple, 
Kalahasteeswarar Temple, 
Gowthameswarar Temple, 
Kottaiyur Kodeeswarar temple 
Amirthakalasanathar Temple, 
Banapuriswarar Temple, 
Abimukeswarar Temple, Kumbakonam, 
Kambatta Visvanathar Temple and 
Ekambareswarar Temple. 
This temple is one among them.

Mahasamprokshanam
The Mahasamprokshanam also known as Kumbabishegam of the temple was held on 26 October 2015.

Notes

References

Mahasamprokshanam 26 October 2015

Hindu temples in Kumbakonam
Shiva temples in Thanjavur district